Buddies is a 1976 Swedish drama film directed by Jan Halldoff. Halldoff won the award for Best Director at the 12th Guldbagge Awards.

Cast
 Anki Lidén as Lena Sjöberg
 Göran Stangertz as Kent Fredrikson
 Thomas Hellberg as Lasse Stark
 Christer Jonsson as Olle Pettersson (credited as Bonzo Jonsson)
 Ted Åström as Sven Risell
 Anne Kulle as Katarina Risell (credited as Anne Nord)
 Kisa Magnusson as Siri
 Ann-Marie Adamsson as Kent's co-worker (credited as Ann-Mari Adamsson)
 Christina Carlwind as Nurse
 Göte Claesson as Editor
 Inger Ellman as Siw Pettersson
 Bo Halldoff as Kent's Chief

References

External links
 
 

1976 films
1976 drama films
Swedish drama films
1970s Swedish-language films
Films directed by Jan Halldoff
Films whose director won the Best Director Guldbagge Award
1970s Swedish films